The Tomb of Benjamin is the traditional burial site of Benjamin according to Judaism, the twelfth and last son of Jacob. On the other side of the bypass road there is also another Islamic shrine called "Nabi Sawarka".

References 

Benjamin
Jewish pilgrimage sites
Archaeological sites in Israel
Kfar Saba